Charles Willard Embree (August 30, 1917 – September 24, 1996) was an American Major League Baseball pitcher. His key pitch was the curveball.

That did not happen, however, he did lead the International League with nineteen wins. He had a stellar minor league career with the Indians, going 74–44 with a 3.07 ERA in their farm system, but it never translated to major league success, mostly due to some hard luck. In , Embree held batters to a .227 batting average, yet he had a losing record (8–12). Despite a respectable 3.29 ERA over parts of six seasons with the Indians, his record was 23–32.

Following the  season, he was dealt to the New York Yankees for outfielder Allie Clark. He started his one season in New York City, in the starting rotation, and was reasonably successful in that role (5–2 with a 3.29 ERA) before moving into the bullpen. At the end of the season, he, Sherm Lollar and Dick Starr, plus $100,000 were sent to the St. Louis Browns for Roy Partee and Fred Sanford.

Embree was once again a starter when he arrived in St. Louis, however, once again lost his starting job when a July 7 loss to the Detroit Tigers in which he lasted just two-thirds of an inning dropped his record to 3–10 with a 5.03 ERA. He made three spot starts after that, going 0–2 with a 12.96 ERA. For the season, he went 3–13 with a 5.37 ERA and a save.

His contract was repurchased by the Indians prior to the start of the  season. He went 31–28 with a 3.96 ERA in two plus seasons with the Pacific Coast League's San Diego Padres before moving to the Chicago White Sox organization during the  season.

Career stats

Over seven minor league seasons, Embree was 100-73 with a 3.49 ERA.

References

External links

1917 births
1996 deaths
Major League Baseball pitchers
Cleveland Indians players
New York Yankees players
St. Louis Browns players
Baseball players from California
People from El Monte, California